Matthew Arnold (1822–1888) was an English poet and cultural critic.

Matthew Arnold may also refer to:

Other people
 Matt Arnold (born 1961), British television reporter
 Matthew Arnold (director) (born 1974), American film and TV director
 Matthew Arnold (cricketer) (born 1988), South African cricketer

Schools
 Matthew Arnold School, Oxford, a secondary coeducational school and sixth form in Oxford.
 Matthew Arnold School, Staines-upon-Thames, a secondary coeducational school in Staines upon Thames, Surrey.

See also 
 Arnold Mathew (1852–1919), first Old Catholic bishop in the UK
 Sir Matthew Arnold Bracy Smith (1879–1959), English painter 
 Matthew Arnold Thiessen (born 1980), Canadian-American musician

Arnold, Matthew